Maharlika Village is one of the 28 barangays of Taguig, Metro Manila, Philippines.

Maharlika Village, which is shaped almost like a square, is bounded by Brgy. South Signal Village to the north, Upper Bicutan to the west, Central Bicutan to the west and south, and by Lower Bicutan and New Lower Bicutan to the east.

The village was created in 1974 when President Ferdinand Marcos set aside  of the Armed Forces of the Philippines Officers Village in Taguig to become a subdivision for Muslim Filipinos. It had been settled by twenty Moro families since the 1950s, led by an imam named Muhammad Kusin. They lived in huts and had requested the government for their own community since 1964. The community grew to 480 families, which included members of the Moro elite, such as descendants of sultans from Mindanao, government officials, military officers, ambassadors and business executives. The government then created two more sitios to the barangay of Maharlika Village: Sitio Imelda Romualdez Marcos and Sitio Bandara-Ingued.

References 

Taguig
Barangays of Metro Manila
Muslim communities of the Philippines